= University of Management & Technology Sialkot Campus =

University in Pakistan

- Location: Sialkot, Punjab, Pakistan
- Website: https://skt.umt.edu.pk/

The University of Management and Technology (UMT) (Urdu: یونیورسٹی آف مینیجمنٹ اینڈ ٹکنالوجی) is a private-sector university located in Lahore, Pakistan. UMT is a project of It is an independent, just for profit private organization. UMT Sialkot Campus was formally opened in Sialkot on May 2, 2012. UMT has the distinction of being the 1st university in Sialkot.
